The Federal Seed Act, P.L. 76-354 (August 9, 1939), requires accurate labeling and purity standards for seeds in commerce, and prohibits the importation and movement of adulterated or misbranded seeds. The law works in conjunction with the Plant Protection Act of 2000 to authorize the Animal and Plant Health Inspection Service (APHIS) to regulate the importation of field crop, pasture and forage, or vegetable seed that may contain noxious weed seeds. USDA's Agricultural Marketing Service is responsible for enforcing the labeling and purity standard provisions.

Titles of the Act
Title 7 Chapter 37 was authored as four titles establishing agricultural policy for the specifications of forage and vegetable seeds.

Title I - Definitions - 7 U.S.C. §§ 1561-1562
Construction with respect to labeling for variety and origin
Agricultural seeds
Vegetable seeds
Weed seeds
Noxious weed seeds
Origin, kind, variety, and type of seeds
Germination
Hard seeds
Pure live seed
Label and labeling of seeds
Advertisement
Subject to prescribed tolerances
False labeling and false advertisement
Screenings
In bulk

Title II - Interstate Commerce - 7 U.S.C. §§ 1571-1575
Prohibitions Relating to Interstate Commerce in Certain Seeds
Records
Exemptions
Disclaimers and Nonwarranties
False Advertising

Title III - Foreign Commerce - 7 U.S.C. §§ 1581-1586
Prohibitions and Procedures Relating to Importations
Adulterated Seed
Seed Unfit for Seeding Purposes
Certain Seeds Required to be Stained
Certain Acts Prohibited

Title IV - General Provisions - 7 U.S.C. §§ 1591-1610
Delegation of Duties
Rules and Regulations
Standards, Tests, and Tolerances
Prohibition Against Alterations
Seizure
Penalties
Cease and Desist Proceedings
Separability of Proceedings
Publication
Authorization for Appropriations
Authorization for Expenditures
Cooperation
Separability of Provisions
Repeals
Effective Date

Amendments to 1939 Act
U.S. Congressional amendments to the Federal Seed Act.

See also

 Plant Disease Bulletin
 Seed bank

References

External links
 
 
 
 
 

1939 in law
1939 in American law
76th United States Congress
United States Department of Agriculture
Seeds
United States federal agriculture legislation